At-Tira is a Palestinian village in the Ramallah and al-Bireh Governorate in the northern West Bank.

Location
It is bordered by Beituniya  to the east and north, Beit 'Ur al Fauqa  to the north and west, Beit ‘Anan to the west, and Beit Duqqu to the south.

History

Ottoman era
In 1838, in the Ottoman era, it was noted as a Muslim village, located in the Beni Malik district, west of Jerusalem.

In 1883, the PEF's Survey of Western Palestine (SWP) described Tireh as: "A small hamlet on a ridge, with a large sacred tree to the north-east (Sheikh Hasan), and a spring ('Ain Jufna) in the valley to the south-west."

British Mandate era
In the 1922 census of Palestine,  conducted by the British Mandate authorities, Al Tireh had a population of 257 Muslims, increasing slightly in the 1931 census to 265 Muslims, in 71 houses in Et Tira.

In the 1945 statistics, the population of Et Tira was 330 Muslims, while the total land area was 3,968 dunams, according to an official land and population survey. Of  this, 193 dunums were used for plantations and irrigable land, 1,974 for cereals, while 23 dunams were classified as built-up areas.

Jordanian era
In the wake of the 1948 Arab–Israeli War, and after the 1949 Armistice Agreements, At-Tira came  under Jordanian rule.

The Jordanian census of 1961 found 534 inhabitants in Tira.

1967-present

Since the Six-Day War in 1967, At-Tira came under Israeli occupation. 

After the 1995 accords, 10.4% of village land was classified as Area B, while the remaining 89.6% was classified as Area C. Israel has confiscated a total of 67 dunams of land from the village in order to construct the Israeli settlement of Beit Horon.

At-Tira, along with 9 other Palestinian villages, Beit Duqqu, Beit 'Anan, Beit Surik, Qatanna, al-Qubeiba, Beit Ijza, Kharayib Umm al Lahimand and Biddu form the "Biddu enclave" which, according to Tanya Reinhart, are imprisoned behind a wall, cut off from their orchards and farmlands that are being seized in order to form the real estate reserves of the Jerusalem Corridor and to create a territorial continuity with Giv'at Ze'ev. The enclave will be linked to Ramallah by underpasses and a road that is fenced on both sides. From the "Biddu enclave" Palestinians will travel along a fenced road that passes under a bypass road to Bir Nabala enclave, then on a second underpass under Bypass Road 443 to Ramallah.

References

Bibliography

External links
Welcome To al-Tira
At Tira Village (Fact Sheet), Applied Research Institute–Jerusalem, ARIJ
At Tira Village Profile, ARIJ
At Tira photo, ARIJ
Locality Development Priorities and Needs in At Tira Village, ARIJ
Survey of Western Palestine, Map 17: IAA, Wikimedia commons 

Ramallah and al-Bireh Governorate
Villages in the West Bank
Municipalities of the State of Palestine